The 2015 UEFA European Under-21 Championship started with a qualifying competition which began in March 2013 and finished in September 2014. The final tournament was held in the Czech Republic. The draw for the qualifying rounds was held on 31 January 2013 in Nyon, with matches played between March 2013 and September 2014.

There were ten groups. Two of these groups had six teams; the remaining eight groups consisted of five teams. Group competition was a double round robin: each team hosted a game with every other team in its group. At the conclusion of qualifying, the 10 teams at the top of each group and four best second-placed teams qualified for the two-legged play-offs  scheduled in October 2014, with the seven winners of the play-off ties joining Czech Republic in the finals.

Seeding
A total of fifty-two participating teams were divided in five draw pots based on the UEFA Under-21 coefficient ranking. Pots A through D contained ten teams, while pot E twelve teams.

Before the draw UEFA confirmed that, for political reasons, Armenia would not be drawn against Azerbaijan (due to the dispute concerning territory of Nagorno-Karabakh) and Georgia would not be drawn against Russia (due to the dispute regarding the territory of South Ossetia and Abkhazia) in the qualifiers for 2015 UEFA European Under-21 Football Championship.

Tiebreakers
If two or more teams are equal on points on completion of the group matches, the following criteria are applied to determine the rankings.
 Higher number of points obtained in the group matches played among the teams in question
 Superior goal difference from the group matches played among the teams in question
 Higher number of goals scored in the group matches played among the teams in question
 Higher number of goals scored away from home in the group matches played among the teams in question
 If, after applying criteria 1) to 4) to several teams, two or more teams still have an equal ranking, the criteria 1) to 4) will be reapplied to determine the ranking of these teams. If this procedure does not lead to a decision, criteria 6) and 7) will apply
 Results of all group matches:
 Superior goal difference
 Higher number of goals scored
 Higher number of goals scored away from home
 Position in the UEFA Under-21 coefficient ranking used for the group stage draw

Qualifying group stage

Group 1

Group 2

Group 3

Group 4

Group 5

Group 6

Group 7

Group 8

Group 9

Group 10

Ranking of second-placed teams
Because some groups contain six teams and some five, matches against the sixth-placed team in each group are not included in this ranking. As a result, eight matches played by each team will count for the purposes of the second-placed table.

The following criteria are applied to determine the rankings.
 Higher number of points obtained in these matches
 Superior goal difference from these matches
 Higher number of goals scored in these matches
 Higher number of away goals scored in these matches
 Position in the UEFA Under-21 coefficient ranking used for the group stage draw

Play-offs

The play-offs for the tournament finals were held on 9,10 and 14 October 2014. The seven winners qualify for the final tournament in Czech Republic.

Seedings
The draw for the play-offs was held on 12 September 2014 in Nyon to determine the seven pairings as well as the order of the home and away ties. The seven group winners with the highest competition coefficients were seeded and were drawn against the unseeded teams. Nations from the same group could not be drawn against each other.

Each nation's coefficient was generated by calculating:
40% of the average ranking points per game earned in the 2015 UEFA European Under-21 Championship qualifying group stage.
40% of the average ranking points per game earned in the 2013 UEFA European Under-21 Championship qualifying stage and final tournament.
20% of the average ranking points per game earned in the 2011 UEFA European Under-21 Championship qualifying stage and final tournament.

Seeded
 

Unseeded

Matches

|}

Top goalscorers
The top scorers in the 2015 UEFA European Under-21 Championship qualification were as follows. Players in italics have also played in the play-offs.

References

External links

 
Qualification
Qual
UEFA European Under-21 Championship qualification